Sander Gillé and Joran Vliegen won the title, defeating Max Purcell and Luke Saville in the final, 7–5, 6–3. This was the first edition of the tournament, primarily organised due to the cancellation of many tournaments during the 2020 season, because of the ongoing COVID-19 pandemic.

Seeds

Draw

Draw

References

External Links
Main Draw

Astana Open - Doubles